Erkalkan (also known as Sihnek) is a village in the Çemişgezek District, Tunceli Province, Turkey. The village is populated by Turks and had a population of 101 in 2021.

The hamlets of Çatalca, Çengel and Gemici are attached to the village.

References 

Villages in Çemişgezek District